The Philadelphia 76ers are an American professional basketball team based in Philadelphia, Pennsylvania. They are a member of the Atlantic Division of the Eastern Conference in the National Basketball Association (NBA). Formerly known as the Syracuse Nationals, the 76ers joined the NBA when it was founded in 1949. The Nationals had a record of 51–13 in their first NBA season under coach Al Cervi and won the Eastern Division crown. The franchise were purchased by Philadelphian Irv Kosloff and Ike Richma in the spring of 1963; the NBA approved their franchise shift on May 22 and name change to the Philadelphia 76ers on August 6. This brought professional basketball back to the city, which had been without a team since the Golden State Warriors left Philadelphia in 1962. After coaching the 76ers since , Doug Collins resigned as head coach on April 18, 2013 following the 2012–13 season. Brett Brown was hired to be the head coach of the 76ers on August 15, 2013 prior to the start of the 2013-14 season. Brett was released as head coach after a 4-0 loss to the Celtics in the 2020 playoffs. On October 3, 2020 Doc Rivers was announced as his replacement.  

There have been 24 head coaches for the Philadelphia 76ers franchise. The franchise won their first NBA championship as the Syracuse Nationals in the 1955 NBA Finals under coach Cervi. Their second title was won as the Philadelphia 76ers in 1967, coached by Alex Hannum, who has the highest career winning percentage for the 76ers. Billy Cunningham, who played and coached with the 76ers for 17 years, is the franchise's all-time leader in both regular season and playoff games coached and wins. He coached the team to their most recent title in 1983.

Hannum, Jack Ramsay, and Larry Brown are the only members of the franchise to have been inducted into the Basketball Hall of Fame as coaches. Cervi, Paul Seymour, and Kevin Loughery served as a player-coaches, and Cervi, after retiring as a player, continued to coach the team for the rest of the season that he retired during and five additional seasons. Six other former players, Hannum, Dolph Schayes, Cunningham, Matt Guokas, Fred Carter, and Maurice Cheeks went on to coach for the franchise.

Key

Coaches
The list does not include NBL seasons.

Notes
 A running total of the number of coaches of the Nationals/76ers. Thus, any coach who has two separate terms as head coach is only counted once.
 Each year is linked to an article about that particular NBA season.
 Cervi served as a player-coach during part of his tenure with the Nationals. He player-coached for 279 games during four of his six seasons.
 Seymour served as a player-coach during part of his tenure with the Nationals. He player-coached for 202 games during his first four seasons.
 Schayes served as a player-coach during part of his tenure with the 76ers.
 Loughery served as a player-coach during his entire tenure with the 76ers.

References
General

Specific

Lists of National Basketball Association head coaches by team

Head coaches